The Virginia Regiment was formed in 1754 by Virginia's Royal Governor Robert Dinwiddie, as a provincial corps. The regiment served in the French and Indian War, with members participating in actions at Jumonville Glen and Fort Necessity in 1754, the Braddock expedition in 1755, and the Forbes expedition in 1758. Small detachments of the regiment were involved in numerous minor actions along Virginia's extensive wilderness frontier.

History
The conflict over the Ohio country led to raising of the first provincial regiment in Virginia. In 1754, the General Assembly of Virginia voted to raise a regiment of 300 men and send it to the confluence of the Alleghany and Monongahela rivers. After the battle of Fort Necessity, the Assembly voted to increase the size of the regiment from five companies to ten. The Virginian provincial troops who participated in the Braddock Expedition of 1755 and suffered defeat at the Battle of the Monongahela were unregimented: at the behest of General Braddock, they had been organized into two companies of carpenters, six companies of rangers, and one troop of mounted rangers, about 450 men in all. The remaining 350 men from the original ten companies of the Virginia Regiment had been allocated to the two regular regiments of the expedition.

After Braddock's defeat, the Virginia Regiment was immediately reformed, with the Assembly voting in 1755 to increase its size again, to 1,500 men organized in 16 companies. The actual strength of the Regiment in 1756 was 1,400 men, but in 1757 it was reduced to 1,000 men. In 1758, Virginia raised two additional regiments of a thousand men each for the Forbes Expedition. The enlistment period for the first regiment expired in May 1759, and for the second in December 1758. After the fall of Fort Duquesne, the Assembly voted in 1759 to fill the one regiment still in service, and to raise a force of another 500 men that would remain in the province for its immediate defense. The regiment would remain in service until May 1760.

With the outbreak of the Cherokee War, the Assembly prolonged the Regiment's service, adding 300 men in three companies as frontier guards. It remained on the Cherokee frontier until early 1762, when the governor disbanded it. When, later in 1762, the British government wished Virginia to raise a regiment which would be put on the regular British establishment, the General Assembly instead voted to re-raise the Virginia Regiment. This re-raised Regiment was finally disbanded in May 1763, just before the outbreak of Pontiac's War, as the province could not maintain it without a supply of paper money, which the Board of Trade had disallowed.

Recruitment
Most recruits were characterized by Washington as "loose, Idle Persons ... quite destitute of House, and Home." Hampered by frequent desertions because of poor supplies, extremely low pay and hazardous duty, Virginia Regiment recruiters went to Pennsylvania and Maryland for men. Washington said of them, " and not a few... have Scarce a Coat, or Waistcoat, to their Backs ..." Later drafts pulled only those who could not provide a substitute or pay the £10 exemption fee, ensuring that only Virginia's poor would be drafted. White males between 16 and 50 were permitted to serve, although the regiment's size rolls report men as young as 15 and as old as 60 in the ranks, along with references to a small number of drafts with partial African and Native American ancestry.

Legacy

The First Virginia Regiment is memorialized in a statue in Meadow Park, a triangular park in Richmond’s (VA) Fan District by sculptor Ferruccio Legnaioli. Dedicated on 1 May 1930, to commemorate the regiment for fighting in seven American Wars, including the Civil War when they served in the Confederate Army. The statue is a seven foot high bronze standing figure of a colonial infantryman that lists the founding date of the Regiment (1754) at its base. The figure is mounted on a pedestal eight feet high which is lined with bronze plaques describing the history and service of the Regiment through seven wars.

The statue was pulled down from its pedestal during the night of 19–20 June 2020. It was the fifth statue toppled in Richmond during a series of civil rights protests.

Colonels
 1754 Colonel Joshua Fry
 1754 Colonel George Washington.
 1755–1757 Colonel George Washington.
 1758: First Virginia Regiment, Colonel George Washington; Second Virginia Regiment, Colonel William Byrd III.
 1759–1762 Colonel William Byrd III.
 1762–1763 Colonel Adam Stephen.

Uniforms

Source:

Successors

 When the Colony of Virginia ordered the creation of multiple regiments in 1775 with the outbreak of the American Revolutionary War, these were called the Virginia Line.
 West Virginia Army National Guard's 201st Field Artillery Regiment can trace its origins to the Virginia Regiment.
 The 1st Virginia Regiment of the Virginia Defense Force is considered the present-day successor to the original Virginia Regiment.

See also
 Great Britain in the Seven Years War
 Virginia militia
 1st Virginia Regiment
 Virginia Defense Force

References

Notes

Cited literature
 Bruce, Philip Alexander (1924). History of Virginia. Vol. I. Chicago: The American Historical Society.
 Crozier, William Armstrong (1954). Virginia Colonial Militia. Baltimore: Southern Book Co.
 Eckenrode, Hamilton James (1913). List of the Colonial Soldiers of Virginia. Clearfield.
 Nichols, Franklin Thayer (1947). "The Organization of Braddock's Army", The William and Mary Quarterly 4(2): 125–147.
 Washington, George (1834). The Writings of George Washington, volume II. J.Sparks (ed.) Boston: Russel, Odiorne, and Metcalf, and Hilliard, Gray, and Co.

External links
 The Virginians Who Fought in the Revolutionary War - Virginia Places
 The Virginia Regiment Uniform 1754-62
 Recreated Waggener's Company of the Virginia Regiment, French and Indian War reenactors

Military units and formations established in 1754
Military units and formations of the French and Indian War
British colonial regiments
George Washington
Military units and formations in Virginia
Military units and formations in West Virginia
1754 establishments in Virginia
Military history of West Virginia